The Aztec death whistle was a whistle exclusively used in several zones of the ancient Mexica, which mimics the sound of a horrifying animal-like screeching, which was thought to be used in warfare to scare away their victims. It is thought that hundreds of warriors would use the whistles at the same time.

References 

Whistles
Aztec warfare